Nigula may refer to several places in Estonia:

Nigula, Lääne County, village in Taebla Parish, Lääne County
Nigula, Tartu County, village in Tartu Parish, Tartu County
Nigula Nature Reserve, in Pärnu County

See also
Viru-Nigula, small borough in Viru-Nigula Parish, Lääne-Viru County